Tswa (Xitswa) is a South-Eastern Bantu language in Southern Mozambique. Its closest relatives are Ronga and Tsonga, the three forming the Tswa–Ronga family of languages.

Tswa is mainly spoken in the rural areas west of Inhambane. Its largest dialect, Hlengwe, extends westwards to Southern Zimbabwe; Maho (2009) considers this to be a distinct language. The other principal dialects are Dzibi (Dzivi) and Dzonga. According to some estimates, there are perhaps more than one million BaTswa, however not all can communicate in Tswa. Many Mozambicans, including census takers, regard it as a dialect of Tsonga.

Alphabet 

Tswa uses a variant of the Latin alphabet previously used for Tsonga. It is partly based on those developed by the Portuguese colonists and Methodist missionaries to the region. The first major transliterator for the Tswa language into English was the Swede J. A. Persson, who consolidated the alphabet for Tswa specifically.

Ŝ and Ẑ are lightly whistled. The letter Q is sometimes used in words imported from Zulu, in which case it is pronounced in various ways, the clicks of Zulu not being native to the Tswa language. There are also several compounds, which include lateral fricatives.

Like most Bantu languages, all syllables end in vowels or nasals. Tone is important but is rarely written.

Basics of grammar 

Tswa is a Bantu language and thus has a noun class system and verbal system easily recognisable to Bantu speakers throughout Eastern and Southern Africa. In general the system is the same as in most Bantu languages. The following details are more specific.

Noun class system
Instead of genders there are eight classes which have a similar but more complex role, where each noun begins with a class prefix as below:

Verbal systems

Tswa verbs change according to status (affirmative/negative), mood (indicative/potential), aspect, tense, number, person and class.
The usual three persons used in the Bantu group apply, and the first and second persons plural are maximally inclusive. The class link is usually written as a separate word, as in Tsonga and Ronga. Otherwise the paradigm is organised as follows:

Affirmative
 Indicative:
 Present
 Present continuous
 Past
 Past continuous
 Perfect
 Pluperfect
 Future
 Future perfect
 Potential:
 Present
 Past
 Perfect

Negative
 Indicative:
 Present
 Past
 Past continuous
 Perfect
 Pluperfect
 Future
 Future Perfect
 Potential:
 Present
 Past
 Perfect

Grammatical Peculiarities of Linguistic Interest

Though Tswa does have a subjunctive, it does not change the standard '-a' at the end of a verb to an '-e' like most of the surrounding Bantu languages, unless it is used as an implied imperative in a dependent clause – a peculiarity it shares with the Tsonga and Ronga.  The 'xi-' class, unlike its seeming equivalents in other languages, more closely mirrors the Nguni 'isi-' in that it has a strongly diminutive use.

Further reading
 Chivambo, Albino. 2022. "Nominal Morphology in Citshwa." Arusha Working Papers in African Linguistics, 4(1): 57-99.
 Chivambo, Albino and Marcelino Liphola. 2022. "Adjustment of Syllabic Structure in Citshwa." Arusha Working Papers in African Linguistics, 4(1): 21-56.

References

Tswa-Ronga languages